Azamgarh railway station is located in Azamgarh, Uttar Pradesh, India. It falls under North Eastern Railway zone's Varanasi railway division. It is electrified single line and station code is AMH. The station consists of three platforms and the station catering to about 30 trains.

Trains running through Azamgarh 
Few major trains that connect through Azamgarh are Anvt Mau Express, Gorakhpur–Mumbai LTT Godan Express, Ahmedabad–Darbhanga Sabarmati Express, Tapti Ganga Express, Kolkata - Azamgarh express and more.

Services 

 Kaifiyaat SF Express
 Azamgarh–Mumbai LTT Weekly Express
 55135/Azamgarh–Varanasi City Passenger (unreserved)
 Azamgarh–Kolkata Weekly Express*

Railway stations in Azamgarh district
Varanasi railway division
Transport in Azamgarh